In medicine (hematology), bleeding diathesis  is an unusual susceptibility to bleed (hemorrhage) mostly due to hypocoagulability (a condition of irregular and slow blood clotting), in turn caused by a coagulopathy (a defect in the system of coagulation). Therefore, this may result in the reduction of platelets being produced and leads to excessive bleeding. Several types of coagulopathy are distinguished, ranging from mild to lethal. Coagulopathy can be caused by thinning of the skin (Cushing's syndrome), such that the skin is weakened and is bruised easily and frequently without any trauma or injury to the body. Also, coagulopathy can be contributed by impaired wound healing or impaired clot formation.

Signs and symptoms

Complications
Following are some complications of coagulopathies, some of them caused by their treatments:

Causes
While there are several possible causes, they generally result in excessive bleeding and a lack of clotting.

Acquired 
Acquired causes of coagulopathy include anticoagulation with warfarin, liver failure, vitamin K deficiency and disseminated intravascular coagulation. Additionally, the hemotoxic venom from certain species of snakes can cause this condition, for example Bothrops, rattlesnakes and other species of viper. Viral hemorrhagic fevers include dengue hemorrhagic fever and dengue shock syndrome.
Leukemia may also cause coagulopathy. Furthermore, cystic fibrosis has been known to cause bleeding diathesis, especially in undiagnosed infants, due to malabsorption of fat soluble vitamins like vitamin K.

Autoimmune causes of acquired coagulation disorders 
There are autoimmune causes of coagulation disorders. They include acquired antibodies to coagulation factors, termed inhibitors of coagulation. The main inhibitor is directed against clotting factor VIII. Another example is antiphospholipid syndrome, an autoimmune, hypercoagulable state.

Causes other than coagulation
Bleeding diathesis may also be caused by impaired wound healing (as in scurvy), or by thinning of the skin, such as in Cushing's syndrome.

Genetic
Some people lack genes that typically produce the protein coagulation factors that allow normal clotting. Various types of hemophilia and von Willebrand disease are the major genetic disorders associated with coagulopathy. Rare examples are Bernard–Soulier syndrome, Wiskott–Aldrich syndrome and Glanzmann's thrombasthenia. Gene therapy treatments may be a solution as they involve in the insertion of normal genes to replace defective genes causing for the genetic disorder. Gene therapy is a source of active research that hold promise for the future.

Diagnosis

Comparing coagulation tests

Treatments
Consult a hematologist and have a regular blood check ups. Have an early diagnostic test for any blood disorders or blood diseases including hemophilia, hemorrhage, and sickle-cell anemia. Prothrombin time and partial thromboplastin time blood tests are useful to investigate the reason behind the excessive bleeding. The PT evaluates coagulation factors I, II, V, VII and X, while the PTT evaluates coagulation factors I, II, V, VIII, IX, X, XI and XII. The analysis of both tests thus helps to diagnose certain disorders.

Blood transfusion involves the transfer of plasma containing all the necessary coagulating factors (fibrinogen, prothrombin, thromboplastin) to help restore them and to improve the immune defense of the patient after excessive blood loss. Blood transfusion also caused the transfer of platelets that can work along with coagulating factors for blood clotting to commence.

Different drugs can be prescribed depending on the type of disease. Vitamins (K, P and C) are essential in case of obstruction to walls of blood vessels. Also, vitamin K is required for the production of blood clotting factors, hence the injection of vitamin K (phytomenadione) is recommended to boost blood clotting.

References

External links 

Bleeding
Coagulopathies